Abu Zur'a Ubaydullah ibn Abdul-Karim ibn Yazid ibn Faruh  (أبو زرعة الرازي, 815/816 or 809/810, in Rey, Iran – 878, in Rey) was a Muslim scholar, Muhaddith from Rey (northern Iran). Abu Zur'a was a relative of another famous Muhaddith Abu Hatim al-Razi (Muhammad ibn Idris).

Not to be confused with Abu Zur'a Ahmad ibn Husayn al-Razi (al-Razi al-Mutawassit or al-Saghir).

References

Hadith compilers
Year of birth uncertain
878 deaths
Biographical evaluation scholars
Hadith scholars
Atharis